Deroceras sturanyi is a species of air-breathing land slug, a terrestrial pulmonate gastropod mollusk in the family Agriolimacidae.

Distribution
This species is not listed in the IUCN red list and therefore is not evaluated (NE) 

It occurs in countries including:
 Czech Republic
 Bulgaria
 Netherlands
 Poland
 Slovakia
 Ukraine
 and others

References

Agriolimacidae
Gastropods described in 1894